The Rashi School is a K-8 Reform Jewish independent school in Dedham, Massachusetts, offering secular and Jewish education. The Rashi School was founded in 1986 and currently enrolls more than 300 students in grades K-8.

The Rashi School is named after one of the greatest Ashkenazi rabbis, Shlomo Yitzchaki, which today is typically known by the acronym Rashi and was a medieval French rabbi and author of a comprehensive commentary on the Talmud. 

In 2010, The Rashi School moved to its permanent campus at a wooded site on the banks of the Charles River, within the NewBridge on the Charles Campus for Hebrew SeniorLife. A consequent relationship with the elderly there has been formed. They have monthly bonding activities for students at the school with the residents.

History
In 1982, Rabbi Henry Zoob formed a committee to explore interest in a Reform Jewish day school. After four years of planning, The Rashi School opened its doors with 16 students in kindergarten and first grade in 1986. The school slowly grew its enrollment as its original students progressed through the grades and in 1992, Rashi celebrated its first graduation ceremony. This group of graduates were also present at Rashi's first alumni event, held in 2002, celebrating their 10th anniversary as alumni.

The Rashi School expanded to an Elementary/Middle School format in 1996. That same year, a group of second graders founded a program called Mitzvah Makers, which created an opportunity for self-selected children to make monthly visits to Hebrew Rehabilitation. Also in 1996, the Rashi Purim Tamchui Project was founded as part of Rashi's social justice curriculum.

In 1999, the Rashi School introduced their core values: Ruach (Spirit), Kavod (Respect), Kehillah (Community), Tzedek (Justice), and Limud (Learning).

2006 marked the first trip taken by the eighth grade class to Israel. This trip, first organized by Rabbi Ellen Pildis, has become an annual tradition and culminating event of Jewish Studies at The Rashi School.

Past locations of The Rashi School

Dedicating the permanent building

On October 17, 2010, over 800 members of the greater Rashi community came together to celebrate the opening of the school's new permanent home on the Hebrew SeniorLife campus.

Garnering a Citation of Excellence Award by Learning by Design magazine, The Rashi School's building was described as "integrating ritual pieces in a very contemporary setting" and lauded for its use of bay window alcoves between classrooms. Rashi's 82,000 square foot building features:
Dedicated music room, science lab, and art studio
6,000 volume library
Sukkat Shalom community space
Beit Midrash for prayer and holiday celebrations
Auditorium for performing arts
Regulation-sized gymnasium and sports fields
3 playgrounds

The building is a LEED (Leadership in Energy and Environmental Design)-certified "green" building.

Notable visitors

Leah Rabin
Dalia Rabin
Henry Kissinger
Coretta Scott King
Kathryn Otoshi

Heads of School

Presidents of the Board of Trustees

References

Schools in Dedham, Massachusetts
Private middle schools in Massachusetts
Private elementary schools in Massachusetts
Private K–8 schools in Massachusetts